The Battle of Königgrätz (or Sadowa) was the decisive battle of the Austro-Prussian War in which the Kingdom of Prussia defeated the Austrian Empire. It took place on 3 July 1866, near the Bohemian city of Hradec Králové (German: Königgrätz) and village of Sadová, now in the Czech Republic.

Prussian forces, totaling around 285,000 troops, used their superior training and tactical doctrine and the Dreyse needle gun to win the battle and the entire war at Königgrätz on their own. Prussian artillery was ineffective and almost all of the fighting on the Prussian side was done by the First Army under Prince Friedrich Karl and one division from the Second Army. The Prussian 7th Infantry Division and 1st Guards Infantry Division attacked and destroyed 38 out of 49 infantry battalions of four Austrian corps at the Swiepwald and Chlum at the centre of the battlefield, deciding the outcome of the struggle and forcing an Austrian retreat at 15:00, before any Prussian reinforcements could even seriously engage the Austrian flanks.

Background

At the outset of the war in June, the Prussian armies were gathered along the Prussian border: the Army of the Elbe under Karl Herwarth von Bittenfeld at Torgau, the First Army under Prince Friedrich Karl of Prussia between Senftenberg and Görlitz, and the Second Army under Crown Prince Frederick William in Silesia west of Neiße (Nysa). The Austrian army under Ludwig von Benedek was concentrated at Olmütz (Olomouc). The campaign began with Herwarth von Bittenfeld's advance to Dresden in the Kingdom of Saxony, where he easily defeated the Saxon army of 23,000 and joined with the First Army.

The  Austrian commander Benedek had only reluctantly moved his troops out of their staging point at Olmütz on 18 June, moving north in three parallel columns with the I Corps protecting the right flank. The Austrians took up positions at the fortress Josefstadt and the mountain passes from Saxony and Silesia.

On 22 June, Prussia's Chief of the General Staff, Helmuth von Moltke, ordered both armies under his command to Jitschin (Jičín) near the Austrian positions, a daring maneuver undertaken to limit the war's duration despite the risk of one army being overtaken en route.

However, Benedek was indecisive and failed to use his superior numbers to eliminate the Prussian armies individually. Initially, the Austrians were pressed back everywhere except at Trautenau (Trutnov), where they bested the Prussians despite great losses to their own forces. By 29 June, Prince Friedrich Karl had reached Jitschin and inflicted a severe defeat on the Austrian I Corps under General Clam-Gallas. The Crown Prince had reached Königinhof (Dvůr Králové) despite stiff resistance.

On 30 June, Friedrich Karl's First Army advanced to within one day's march of the Second Army. However, for the next two days the Prussian cavalry lost sight of the Austrians entirely, although Moltke's guess as to their actions—a retreat to the Elbe River—proved correct.

Prelude

Dismayed by his losses, Benedek had ordered a withdrawal and urgently requested that Emperor Franz Josef make peace as the only way to save the army from a "catastrophe". When this was refused, and an ambiguous last sentence of the imperial telegram was interpreted as ordering a final stand, Benedek drew his Austrians up against the Elbe between Sadowa and Königgrätz.

The Prussians finally sighted the Austrians on the eve of 2 July near Sadowa, and Friedrich Karl planned to attack the next morning. Moltke ordered the Crown Prince Frederick William to join forces with the other two armies at the point where the Austrians were assembled, but the telegraph lines to the Second Army's positions were out, necessitating the dispatch of two mounted officers at midnight to ride the twenty miles' distance in time. They arrived at 4 a.m. The Crown Prince's Chief of Staff, Leonhard von Blumenthal, an able logistician, immediately reorganised Second Army's route plan.

Battle

The Austrian army of 215,000 faced the Prussian Army of the Elbe (39,000) and First Army (85,000) on 3 July. The Austrian infantry was partially fortified and supported by cavalry in the rear and artillery units with firing range across hilly, wooded terrain. The battle began at dawn in subsiding rain and mist as Prussia took its position west of the Bystřice River. Shortly before 8 a.m., the Austrian artillery opened fire, pinning down the Prussian right flank under Herwarth von Bittenfeld. The Saxons on the Austrian left fell back in good order, and proceeded to rain down fire on the advancing Prussian right from higher ground. Herwarth von Bittenfeld hesitated to order a full attack, and instead the advance guard of seven battalions, under Brig. General von Schöler pulled back to the river around 10:00 and took a defensive stance.

Prussian advance into the Swiepwald
The Prussian center, with the Prussian 7th Division under General Edward Frederick Charles von Fransecky, having secured the Prussian rear earlier, led the advance into the Swiepwald (Swiep Forest), where it was met by two Austrian corps. The 7th Division had to both clear out the forest, and cover the Prussian left until the Second Army, under the crown prince, arrived. The Prussians methodically cleared the villages of Austrian defenders. King Wilhelm I of Prussia ordered the First Army across the river to support Fransecky. Sadowa was captured, but a fierce battle ensued in a nearby forest. The Austrian artillery held off the Prussians by firing into the smoke of the Prussian advance. The Prussians were slowed, and although the river was easy to wade, transporting artillery across it was extremely difficult.  The Prussian attack was halted as the advancing Prussian 8th and 4th Divisions were cut down by the Austrian artillery as soon as they emerged from the smoke. However, the Austrian leader, Benedek, refused to call for a cavalry charge which later commentators have argued might have won the battle. Reserve units were deployed at noon, but the outcome of the battle was still uncertain and Prussian commanders anxiously waited for the crown prince.

To this point the Austrian superiority in numbers and position had held the day. Their weapons had longer range, which meant that the outnumbered Prussians could neither advance against the artillery barrage, nor effectively engage the Austrian infantry. The Prussians had attempted to bring three armies together for the battle, but problems with sending orders by telegraph and moving men by railroad had meant that only two of the three armies had arrived in time. The Prussian center, in the cover of the forest, was able to hold its position, and discourage a mounted charge by the Austrians, who were thought to have superior cavalry. However the close contact of the fight in the forest began to negate the Austrian advantages, the Austrians could not train their artillery on the close fighting, the damp weather made a cavalry charge risky, and the Austrian IV Corps was committed piecemeal to the fighting. At this point the relative strengths of the two armies were beginning to reverse. The shorter range of the Prussian artillery as compared to the Austrian was moot, while the vastly higher rate of fire from the Prussian breechloading needle gun, compared to the Austrian muzzleloading small arms and cannon, were paramount. In addition the needle gun could be operated while prone in defense, and while moving quickly on the advance, while the Austrians had to stand up after each shot to reload their Lorenz rifles.

Austrian counterattack

At 11:00 came the deciding moment of the battle; the Austrian centre began a manoeuvre to flank the Prussian 7th Division, which had pushed back and held off nearly a quarter of the Austrian army. Colonel Carl von Pöckh was sent to drive the Prussians back, and with a fierce infantry charge managed to force the 7th Division back to the outskirts of the forest. Flanking fire raked Pöckh's battalion, annihilating it as a fighting force and killing its commander. The fire came from the 8th Division which stiffened the Prussian center to hold off the Austrian thrusts.

The Austrians did during the morning had the possibility to win the battle by enveloping the Prussian left (Fransecky) with superior numbers (3 Corps and various cavalry divisions) before the Prussian crown prince's 2nd army arrived at the battlefield. Benedek however neglected to utilize the closing timeframe which during the morning he enjoyed when the Prussian armies remained separated. In effect, between 11:00 and 13:00 - when the Prussian left and center was on the verge of breaking and Moltke feared such an Austrian move - various Austrian corps commanders (Mollinary, Ramming, Thun, Ernst) all at various moments pleaded with Benedek to do just that, but they were all rebuffed or ignored by the vacillating commander, until it was too late and the Crown Prince’s 2nd army arrived on the field.

While divisions from the Austrian II and IV Corps were committed to the fighting, there was no decisive infantry charge, nor did the Prussians present a flank that could be attacked with cavalry. The Austrians ultimately were caught having moved from their defensive position to attack, and their right flank was exposed to the arriving Prussian infantry.

However, neither cavalry nor artillery gave direct help to the Prussian Infantry. Around 12:30 two rifled batteries of 2nd Division arrived, and around 13:00, Oberst von Bülow, part of Army of the Elbe, brought the corps artillery, two regiments, to the battlefield. After 1 o'clock, Oberst von Rozynski commanded 66 guns in this area. However they were too far to the rear to be used effectively. This kept Karl Eberhard Herwarth von Bittenfeld from ordering a major attack against the Austrian left.

Arrival of the Prussian Second Army

At 14:30 Crown Prince Frederick William finally arrived with the main bulk of his almost 100,000 men, having marched with all possible haste all morning, and hit the Austrian right flank retiring from the Swiepwald while the Prussian artillery pounded the Austrian center. By 16:00 the last individual counter-attacks by the Austrian I and VI Corps were broken, even as Benedek ordered a withdrawal. Lt. General  1st Prussian Guard reached the Austrian artillery, forcing them to stop reforming an artillery line and pull back. He had attacked because he saw the artillery as holding together the Austrian position, and his attack destroyed the lone cavalry battery that stayed to fight, and forced the others to flee, along with their reserves.

At this point, having taken severe casualties, lacking artillery and cavalry cover, the high ground in enemy hands and the center being rolled up, the position for the Austrians deteriorated rapidly. The Second Prussian Army completely broke through the Austrian lines and took  behind the center. The Army of the Elbe, which had merely held position after the early morning bloodying by the Austrian artillery and the Saxon infantry, attacked and broke through the Austrian left flank. It seized , and proceeded to destroy the Austrian flank. The Prussian king ordered all remaining forces into the attack all along the line, which had been slowed by the final counter-attack from the battalions of Brigadier General Ferdinand Rosenzweig von Dreuwehr's Austrian brigade. The arriving reinforcements joined the fight just as the Austrians had forced the 1st Prussian Guard back to Chlum. The result was a decisive shock of firepower which collapsed the Austrian line. The Prussian advance was so rapid that Benedek ordered a series of cavalry countercharges to back up his artillery and cover the general retreat he ordered at 15:00. These were successful at covering the Austrian rear, keeping the bridges over the Elbe open for retreating Austrian soldiers, and preventing pursuit by the Prussians, but at a terrible cost: 2,000 men and almost as many horses were killed, wounded or captured in the action. Benedek himself crossed the Elbe near 18:00 and several hours later informed the emperor that the catastrophe of which he had warned had indeed occurred.

The battle ended with heavy casualties for the Austrians. The Prussians had some 9,000 men killed, wounded or missing. The Austrians and allies had more than 44,000 men killed, wounded or missing, with 22,170 captured. Compounding the Austrians' losses was Austria's earlier refusal to sign the First Geneva Convention. As a result, Austrian medical personnel were regarded as combatants, and withdrew from the field with the main bulk of the forces, leaving the wounded to die on the field.

Aftermath

Königgrätz was the decisive battle of the Austro-Prussian War. The Prussians then continued to pursue the defeated Austrian Nord-Armee and fought a series of minor clashes, with the last skirmish being fought at Blumenau on 22 July, just as the Peace of Prague to put a halt to the fighting was being signed. It provided a great opportunity for Prussian statesmen, by clearing a path toward German unification, in particular with the Little Germany (Germany without Austria) solution, with the subsequent foundation of the North German Confederation. The outcome also ensured that Prussia would have a free hand when a war with France came to pass in 1870.

After this Prussian victory, France attempted to extract territorial concessions in the Palatinate and Luxembourg. In his speech to the Reichstag on 2 May 1871, Chancellor Otto von Bismarck stated:

The Königgrätzer Marsch was written to commemorate the battle.

The French public resented the Prussian victory and demanded "Revanche pour Sadova" or "Revenge for Sadowa", which formed part of the background to the Franco-Prussian War of 1870.

See also
 Cannoneer Jabůrek, a satirical song about a fictional Czech participant in the battle
 Königsberger Paukenhund, traditional kettle drum dog of the Prussian infantry, originating from this battle
 Königgrätzer Marsch, a German military march commemorating the battle

Citations

Bibliography
 .

Further reading

External links

 A map and timeline of the Battle of Königgrätz
Bellum.cz – Battle of Königgrätz 3rd July 1866

Koniggratz
Koniggratz
Koniggratz
Koniggratz
Hradec Králové
1866 in the Austrian Empire
19th century in Bohemia
July 1866 events
1866 in Germany
Frederick III, German Emperor
History of the Hradec Králové Region